Kocayer is a village in Mersin Province, Turkey. It is a part of Mezitli district which is an intracity district of Greater Mersin. It is situated in the Toros Mountains. The population of Kocayer was 666 in 2011.

References

External links
 Photos

Villages in Mezitli District